Alexander Berger (born 27 September 1988) is an Austrian professional volleyball player. He is a member of the Austria national team. At the professional club level, he plays for Cuprum Lubin.

Honours

Clubs
 CEV Champions League 
  2016/2017 – with Sir Sicoma Colussi Perugia

 National championships
 2009/2010  Austrian Championship, with Hypo Tirol Innsbruck
 2010/2011  Austrian Championship, with Hypo Tirol Innsbruck
 2011/2012  Austrian Championship, with Hypo Tirol Innsbruck
 2013/2014  Austrian Cup, with Hypo Tirol Innsbruck
 2013/2014  Austrian Championship, with Hypo Tirol Innsbruck
 2017/2018  Italian SuperCup, with Sir Safety Conad Perugia
 2017/2018  Italian Cup, with Sir Safety Conad Perugia
 2017/2018  Italian Championship, with Sir Safety Conad Perugia
 2018/2019  Italian Cup, with Sir Safety Conad Perugia

Individual awards
 2016: European League – Best Outside Spiker

References

External links

 
 Player profile at LegaVolley.it 
 Player profile at PlusLiga.pl 
 Player profile at Volleybox.net

1988 births
Living people
People from Vöcklabruck
Sportspeople from Upper Austria
Austria men's volleyball players
Austrian expatriate sportspeople in France
Expatriate volleyball players in France
Austrian expatriate sportspeople in Italy
Expatriate volleyball players in Italy
Austrian expatriate sportspeople in Turkey
Expatriate volleyball players in Turkey
Austrian expatriate sportspeople in Poland
Expatriate volleyball players in Poland
Halkbank volleyball players
Czarni Radom players
Cuprum Lubin players
Outside hitters